The , signed as Route C1, is one of the routes of the Shuto Expressway system serving the central part of the Greater Tokyo Area. In addition to serving areas of central Tokyo, the Inner Circular Route also serves as the origin of the radial routes of the Shuto Expressway. A section of the expressway is built above the Shibuya River.

History
The expressway was built between 1962 and 1967, partly in preparation for the 1964 Summer Olympics. In 2009, Tokyo private industries proposed funding a project to dismantle the elevated expressway and put them underground.

In May 2020, the Shuto Expressway Company received approval for plans to relocate 1.8 kilometers of the expressway underground between Kandabashi and Edobashi Junctions, in the area where the Nihonbashi Bridge is located. Construction will commence with the permanent closure of the Edobashi and Gofukubashi entrance and exit ramps on 10 May 2021. Construction is expected to be completed in fiscal year 2040.

List of interchanges
List of interchanges ordered clockwise beginning with Edobashi Junction. The entire expressway is in Tokyo.

References

AH1
C1
Ring roads in Japan
Roads in Tokyo